The Identity card of Bosnia and Herzegovina (Bosnian: Lična karta, Serbian: Лична карта, Croatian: Osobna iskaznica) is a compulsory identity document issued in Bosnia and Herzegovina. All citizens of Bosnia and Herzegovina who are residents of Bosnia and Herzegovina and are over the age of 15 have the right to apply for the national ID card; nevertheless, all citizens of Bosnia and Herzegovina that are over the age of 18 must have an Identity Card issued by the police (Ministarstvo unutarnjih poslova - MUP) by the city of residence.

On 1 March 2013, Bosnia and Herzegovina created a new electronic ID card costing 18 convertible marks (9,2 Euros). Thanks to the production technology of electronic identity cards, risk of falsifying documents was reduced with the use of digital presentation and digital signature. Other protective elements in identity card are fully compliant with EU recommendations.

Physical appearance
The identity card is made of plastic and rectangular in shape, resembling the shape of a credit card, measuring 86 × 54 millimetres in size. On the left side of the ID is the photograph of the bearer, whereas on the opposite side, a hologram is placed, with the country's coat of arms and name being visible. The top edge of the card, or "the header", bears the name of Bosnia and Herzegovina in three/four languages (Latin inscription is the same), Bosnian and/or Serbian and/or Croatian, also Serbian (in Cyrillic), in French and in English (BOSNA I HERCEGOVINA / БОСНА И ХЕРЦЕГОВИНА / BOSNIE-HERZÉGOVINE / BOSNIA AND HERZEGOVINA); and on its reverse, the name of the card is written in the same languages, with an additional line inserted in Croatian. (LIČNA KARTA / OSOBNA ISKAZNICA / ЛИЧНА КАРТА / CARTE NATIONALE D'IDENTITÉ / NATIONAL IDENTITY CARD).

Printed data
The descriptions of the fields where the citizen's information is visible is shown in Bosnian, Croatian (one field only), Serbian (Cyrillic), French and English.

Front side:
Surname
Name
Sex
Date of birth
Date of expiry
Citizenship
Signature
Identity Card Number

Back side:
Place of birth
Municipality of residence
Issued by
Entity citizenship (optional)
Personal ID Number (JMBG)
Date of issue
Blood type (optional)
Remarks
Machine-readable data

Fines
Citizens over the age of 18 who do not have valid identification are subject to a fine in Bosnia and Herzegovina's convertible marks. If a citizen fails to produce a valid ID to a person of high rank (such as a police officer), the fine can be raised.

Countries
A Bosnian-Herzegovinan ID Card is accepted as a travel document by the following countries:

See also
Bosnia and Herzegovina passport

References

External links

ID card
Bosnia and Hercegovina